Buckland including Buckland Valley is a village near (and now merged with) Dover, England.  It is noted for the Buckland Anglo-Saxon cemetery whose finds now belong to the British Museum but are on display at Dover Museum.

English railway contractor, Edward Betts, was born in Buckland.

External links
Dover-Kent.co.uk - Buckland

References

Dover District
Villages in Kent